Bellshill is a suburb of Glasgow, Scotland.

Bellshill may also refer to:	

 Bellshill, Alberta, Canada
 Bellshill, Northumberland, a village in England

See also
Bell Hill (disambiguation)